Ana Emilia Pellicer López de Llergo (born 1946) is a Mexican sculptor, artisan and jewelry maker. She is the widow of American sculptor, James Metcalf, with whom she established an important artist colony and school, the Adolfo Best Maugard School of Arts and Crafts, dedicated to the promotion of traditional coppersmith techniques in Santa Clara del Cobre, Michoacán, in 1973. In 1986, Pellicer sculpted life size jewelry designed to fit the Statue of Liberty, including huge earrings, to mark the centenary of the statue in New York City and Paris.

Ana Pellicer was awarded the Gertrudis Bocanegra medal in 2018, this award is given to women who do exceptional work in favor of the progress of the state of Michoacán. Part of this work was performed during her first years living in Santa Clara del Cobre, where she encouraged women to become involved in the production of jewelry, thus helping them improve their economic standing and that of their families.

Pellicer is the sister of Mexican actresses Pilar Pellicer and Pina Pellicer.

References

Mexican sculptors
People from Santa Clara del Cobre
Living people
Artists from Michoacán
1946 births